General elections were held in Mozambique on 1 and 2 December 2004 to elect a president and the Assembly of the Republic. Incumbent president Joaquim Chissano stepped down after 18 years in power, with five candidates running to succeed him. Armando Guebuza of the ruling FRELIMO party won, with over 60% of the vote. FRELIMO also won the Assembly elections, taking 160 of the 250 seats. Turnout for both elections was just over 36%.

Results

President
Officials expected the winner to be formally announced on 17 December, but it was delayed until 21 December. Guebuza won with 63.7% of the vote, and took office in February 2005. Afonso Dhlakama of RENAMO came second with 31.7% of the vote, and announced that he did not recognize the results.

Assembly

References

Presidential elections in Mozambique
Elections in Mozambique
Mozambique
General election
Mozambican general election